Visa requirements for Salvadoran citizens are administrative entry restrictions by the authorities of other states placed on citizens of El Salvador. As of 2 July 2021, Salvadoran citizens had visa-free or visa on arrival access to 141 countries and territories, ranking the Salvadoran passport 37th in terms of travel freedom according to the Henley Passport Index.



Visa requirements map

Visa requirements
Visa requirements for holders of normal passports traveling for tourist purposes:

Territories and non-UN Member States
Visa requirements for El Salvador citizens for visits to various territories, disputed areas, non-UN member states and restricted zones:

See also

Visa policy of El Salvador
Salvadoran passport

References and Notes
References

Notes

El Salvador
Foreign relations of El Salvador